Honeymoon Deferred  (Italian: Due mogli sono troppe) is a 1951 British-Italian comedy film directed by Mario Camerini and starring Sally Ann Howes, Griffith Jones, and Kieron Moore.

The film's sets were designed by the art directors Gianni Polidori and Ivan King. It was partly shot on location in Italy, and was one of two co-productions in Italy that producer Joseph Janni oversaw during the period, along with the melodrama The Glass Mountain (1949). Separate English- and Italian-language versions were released.

Synopsis
A British couple honeymooning in Italy plan to visit Rome and take in the opera and the various historical sights of the city. However, after taking the wrong train, they end up in the village where the husband, David, had fought and taken shelter as a British Army officer during the Second World War. Regarded as a hero by the villagers, it soon becomes apparent that one of the local woman is claiming that David has already married her and is the father of her young child named Churchill.

Curiosity 
The film was shot almost entirely in Colli a Volturno, in the province of Isernia in Molise even if in fiction the town is called Poppi del Sangro.

Main cast 
Sally Ann Howes as Katherine Fry 
Griffith Jones as David Fry 
Kieron Moore as Rocco 
Lea Padovani as Rosina Maggini 
Ada Dondini as Mama Pia 
Luigi Moneta as Grandpa Maggini 
David Keir as Professore
 Pietro Meloni as Churchill
 Roger Moore as Ornithologist on a Train

References

External links 

Honeymoon Deferred on BFI

1951 films
1950s English-language films
Films scored by Nino Rota
Italian black-and-white films
1950s Italian-language films
Italian comedy films
1951 comedy films
Films set in Italy
Films shot in Italy
British comedy films
British World War II films
Films with screenplays by Noel Langley
British black-and-white films
Films directed by Mario Camerini
1950s British films
1950s Italian films
Italian World War II films